The Willis G. Clark House (also known as Beaver Meadow) is a historic house located in Northern Mobile County, Alabama.

Description and history 
The two-story Greek Revival style house was completed in 1865 for Willis Gaylord Clark. Clark, a native of New York, was a successful Mobile politician, businessman, author, and the editor of the Mobile Daily Advertiser. He also served as a trustee of the University of Alabama, with the university's Clark Hall named in his honor. The house was added to the National Register of Historic Places on January 25, 1990, due to its architectural significance.

References

Houses on the National Register of Historic Places in Alabama
National Register of Historic Places in Mobile County, Alabama
Houses in Mobile County, Alabama
Houses completed in 1865
Greek Revival houses in Alabama